Sinezona laqueus is a species of minute sea snail, a marine gastropod mollusc or micromollusc in the family Scissurellidae, the little slit shells.

Distribution
This marine species occurs off New Zealand.

References

 Powell A. W. B., New Zealand Mollusca, William Collins Publishers Ltd, Auckland, New Zealand 1979 
 Geiger D.L. (2012) Monograph of the little slit shells. Volume 1. Introduction, Scissurellidae. pp. 1-728. Volume 2. Anatomidae, Larocheidae, Depressizonidae, Sutilizonidae, Temnocinclidae. pp. 729–1291. Santa Barbara Museum of Natural History Monographs Number 7.

Scissurellidae
Gastropods of New Zealand
Gastropods described in 1927
Taxa named by Harold John Finlay